Al-Shabab won the championship again for the second time and the second time in a row after winning the end of season championship final on penalties against Al-Ettifaq.

Promoted teams Al-Nahda and Al Ohud were relegated.

Stadia and locations

Final League table

Promoted: Al Nejmeh, Al Raed.

Playoffs

Semifinals

Final

External links 
 RSSSF Stats
 Saudi Arabia Football Federation
 Saudi League Statistics

Saudi Premier League seasons
Saudi Professional League
Professional League